Signe Pierce is an American artist. She has worked in performance, photography, video and digital art. Her works have been shown at the Museum of Contemporary Art in Los Angeles, at the Museum of Modern Art and the New Museum in New York, and at the Palais de Tokyo in Paris.

Pierce has a BFA in photography from the School of Visual Arts in Manhattan.

In 2013, she performed in a short film, American Reflexxx, shot by her girlfriend Alli Coates. It shows Pierce, in a short dress and a mirror-finish mask, moving through the streets of Myrtle Beach, South Carolina, where she is derided and then attacked. It was shown at "Bushwick Gone Basel", an event in a bar in Miami Beach during Art Basel Miami in 2013, and at the BHFQU Brucennial in 2014. It has been watched more than 1.7 million times on YouTube.

Rhizome called it "a brave work that construes many related topics within current cyberfeminist discourses", while Art F City said it was "terrifying, surreal—and true." Her work often includes pink and purple neon lights and "spans photography, performance, and installation." 

Pierce's work is feminist and she identifies as one, but also states she has "been thinking about the binary aspects of the term 'feminist' and how we can move past gendered terms in general."

Pierce's work has also been shown at the Castor Gallery's SATELLITE Art Show (2016), the Nathalie Halgand Galerie in Vienna (2017), and the Annka Kultys Gallery in London (2018 & 2019). In 2020, Pierce's work was one of 35 artists included in "Time for Outrage!" at the Kunstpalast Düsseldorf.

Notes

1988 births
Living people
American women artists
Artists from Tucson, Arizona
21st-century American women